The 1997–98 Alabama–Huntsville Chargers ice hockey team represented the University of Alabama in Huntsville in the 1997–98 NCAA Division II men's hockey season, winning the national championship.  It was the school's second NCAA national championship, following the 1995–96 season.  The team was coached by Doug Ross and played their home games at the Von Braun Center.

The team completed the regular season with 22 wins, 3 losses, and 3 ties. UAH was then invited to play the Bemidji State Beavers in a two-game series to determine the Division II National Championship at Huntsville's Von Braun Center. The Chargers would take the championship after a 6–2 victory on March 13 and a 5–2 victory the following day.

Roster

|}

Season

Schedule

|-
!colspan=12 style=""| Regular Season

|-
!colspan=12 style=""| NCAA Championship Series

Statistics

Skaters

Goaltenders

References

Alabama–Huntsville Chargers men's ice hockey seasons
NCAA men's ice hockey championship seasons
Alabama Huntsville
1997 in sports in Alabama
Alabama-Huntsville Chargers men's ice hockey